HMY Kitchen was an English royal yacht, built in 1670 at Rotherhithe by a man named Castle for the Royal Navy.

References 

1670s ships
Royal Yachts of the Kingdom of England